National Highway 327 (NH 327) is a  National Highway in India. It is a spur road of National Highway 27. NH327 route was extended from Galgalia in West Bengal to Bangaon in Bihar.

See also 

 List of National Highways in India by highway number
 List of National Highways in India by state

References

External links 

 NH 327 on OpenStreetMap

National highways in India
National Highways in West Bengal
National Highways in Bihar